Physics of Life Reviews is a quarterly peer-reviewed scientific journal covering research on living systems. It was established in 2004 and is published by Elsevier. The editor-in-chief is Leonid Perlovsky. The scope of the journal includes living systems, complex phenomena in biological systems, and related fields of artificial life, robotics, mathematical bio-semiotics, and artificial intelligent systems. According to the Journal Citation Reports, the journal has a 2021 impact factor of 9.833.

References

External links
 

Quarterly journals
English-language journals
Elsevier academic journals
Publications established in 2004
Biophysics journals
Review journals